Richard Lounder (born 20 January 1967) is a former Australian rules footballer who played four games for the Richmond Football Club in the Victorian Football League.

Lounder was a big framed ruckman who had much hype being taken at number one of the 1987 National Draft after playing a couple of seasons at Central District in the SANFL. He made his VFL in Round 5, 1989, kicking four goals against the Kangaroos, which was his career highlight. His next three games were not as impressive and he did not play again in the VFL/AFL, returning to South Australia at the end of the season. He played two more seasons for Central District before retiring from state level football at the age of 24. Lounder remains the heaviest player ever to play for Richmond.

References

External links

1967 births
Living people
Australian rules footballers from South Australia
Richmond Football Club players
Central District Football Club players